Pateros is the lone and 1st class municipality in Metropolitan Manila, Philippines.

Pateros may also refer to:
Pateros, Washington, a city located in Okanogan County, Washington, United States
Pateros Church, a Roman Catholic church in Pateros, Philippines
Pateros High School, a secondary school in Pateros, Washington

See also
2016 Pateros local elections, a general election in the Philippines